Dahmed Ould Teguedi (born November 15, 1984) is a former Mauritanian professional football player and current coach of the Mauritanian under 17 national team. He played for MC Saïda and CA Batna in Algerian Ligue Professionnelle 1 , Olympic Club de Safi in Botola and finally retiring in his hometown club Nouakchott Kings in Ligue 1 Mauritania.

References

External links
 DZFoot Profile
 
 http://www.footballdatabase.eu

1984 births
Living people
Algerian Ligue Professionnelle 1 players
CA Batna players
Expatriate footballers in Algeria
Expatriate footballers in Morocco
Mauritania international footballers
Mauritanian footballers
Mauritanian expatriate footballers
MC Saïda players
People from Nouakchott
Mauritanian expatriate sportspeople in Algeria
Mauritanian expatriate sportspeople in Morocco
Association football central defenders